In mathematics, especially in topology, a Kuranishi structure is a smooth analogue of scheme structure. If a topological space is endowed with a Kuranishi structure, then locally it can be identified with the zero set of a smooth map , or the quotient of such a zero set by a finite group. Kuranishi structures were introduced by Japanese mathematicians Kenji Fukaya and Kaoru Ono in the study of Gromov–Witten invariants and Floer homology in symplectic geometry, and were named after Masatake Kuranishi.

Definition

Let  be a compact metrizable topological space. Let  be a point.

where

  is a smooth orbifold;
  is a smooth orbifold vector bundle;
  is a smooth section;
  is a homeomorphism.

They should satisfy that .

where

  is an open sub-orbifold;
  is an orbifold embedding;

In addition, these data must satisfy the following compatibility conditions:

 ;
 .

 

where

In addition, the coordinate changes must satisfy the cocycle condition, namely, whenever , we require that

 

over the regions where both sides are defined.

History

In Gromov–Witten theory, one needs to define integration over the moduli space of pseudoholomorphic curves . This moduli space is roughly the collection of maps  from a nodal Riemann surface with genus  and  marked points into a symplectic manifold , such that each component satisfies the Cauchy–Riemann equation

 .

If the moduli space is a smooth, compact, oriented manifold or orbifold, then the integration (or a fundamental class) can be defined. When the symplectic manifold  is semi-positive, this is indeed the case (except for codimension 2 boundaries of the moduli space) if the almost complex structure  is perturbed generically. Such configurations make the moduli space very singular so a fundamental class cannot be defined in the usual way.

The notion of Kuranishi structure was a way of defining a virtual fundamental cycle, which plays the same role as a fundamental cycle when the moduli space is cut out transversely. It was first used by Fukaya and Ono in defining the Gromov–Witten invariants and Floer homology, and was further developed when Fukaya, Oh Yong-Geun, Hiroshi Ohta, and Ono studied Lagrangian intersection Floer theory.

References

 

Topology